Kid Quantum is the name of three fictional superheroes that appear in comic books published by DC Comics who are members of different incarnations of the Legion of Super-Heroes.

Fictional character biographies

Original

James Cullen, the first Kid Quantum, was retconned into the Legion's past, ostensibly as a result of a history-changing disaster. He was described as having been the first Legionnaire to die in action, as well as the reason for the Legion's rule against members whose superhuman abilities were solely technological; it was later revealed that "James Cullen" was a constructed identity used by a cluster of shapeshifting amoeboid "Proteans", who were seeking to protect their race, and that, instead of being killed, Cullen had simply gone into hiding until such time as it was safe. This plotline was never fully resolved, as the Legion's universe was subsequently "rebooted" with the Zero Hour mini-series.

Reboot

James Cullen
The second Kid Quantum was also named James Cullen, but this one was an actual person rather than a constructed identity. Like his previous counterpart, he used a so-called "stasis belt" to augment his power to freeze time within a limited area to useful levels. He became a member of the Legion of Super-Heroes and became its first member to die due to his overconfidence and a belt malfunction. His death also caused the "no technology powers" rule to be implemented when later characters were recruited.

Jazmin Cullen
The third Kid Quantum was James' sister Jazmin. After her brother's death, she underwent surgery to augment her power to a level where she would not require the belt. Despite initial hostility to the Legion when she first joined, she was eventually elected leader of the team, thanks in large part to Cosmic Boy's recommendation of her; she later entered into a relationship with him. Jazmin is a native of the planet Xanthu.

Post-Infinite Crisis
Following the Infinite Crisis, the Multiverse was reborn, now with 52 alternate Earths. In the recent Countdown: Arena mini-series, Monarch, formerly Captain Atom, began assembling a team made up of alternate versions of heroes from various Earths. In the final issue, he killed every single alternate version of himself to gain their power. James Cullen was seen among the various Captain Atoms.

Jazmin returned from limbo, alongside the rest of her Legion in Final Crisis: Legion of 3 Worlds to fight the new Legion of Super-Villains.

Powers and abilities
Jazmin/Kid Quantum has the ability to create time-stasis fields in a limited area, within which she can slow down or accelerate time. The fields aren't large generally, no larger than a person, and the effect is measured in minutes rather than something long term. Against a powerful force, the maintenance of the fields drains after a time, but normal small fields in the short term have little effect on her energy levels. She can slow things down, in the short term, to almost but not quite stopped, and she can speed things up dramatically, again in short bursts.

In other media
Kid Quantum makes a cameo appearance in the Superman: The Animated Series episode "New Kids in Town".

She also makes a cameo appearance in the 2023 animated movie: Legion of Super-Heroes.

External links
A Hero History of Kid Quantum

Comics characters introduced in 1992
Comics characters introduced in 1996
DC Comics metahumans
DC Comics aliens
DC Comics extraterrestrial superheroes
DC Comics female superheroes 
DC Comics telepaths 
DC Comics characters who are shapeshifters
Fictional characters who can manipulate time